Handique Girls College is a constituent college of the University of Gauhati. It is one of the oldest colleges located in the Indian state of Assam and offers undergraduate courses in Arts and Science.

History
The College has its roots initially as Panbazar Girls' High school. Subsequently, the Handique Girls College was established in 1939 as the Guwahati Girls College. Mrs Rajabala Das was the founder principal of the college. The college was initially located in the Panbazar area of the city. With the shifting to the present site in 1940, the college was renamed Handique Girls College (in honour of noted philanthropist R. K. Handique), and became affiliated to the University of Calcutta. The college later become affiliated to the University of Gauhati following its establishment in 1948.

College principals
The college has had eleven principals:

Campus
The college is situated on the western bank of the Dighalipukhuri in Guwahati. The present campus is spread over two acre of land. The Government of Assam has allocated an additional four acre of land for future expansion.

Student accommodation
The Nirmal Prova Bordoloi Hostel is situated just opposite to the college campus on the eastern side of the Dighalipukhuri. It is a three storied building with additional residential complex for Hostel Super and other staff members.

Departments
The college has eighteen departments offering major and general courses. The college offers courses of study in both Arts and Science faculties up to Degree Major level. The medium of instruction is English. However, Assamese is also used as complementary to English. Conforming to the national pattern of education, 10+2+3 structure is followed in the state of Assam and the Three Year Degree Course (TDC) has been introduced from the 1984-85 session.

The following is a list of courses offered at the college:

Societies
The following is a list of societies active in the college:

Festivals
The college celebrates two major festivals during the annual session:

Freshers Social
Saraswati Puja
 Cultural week followed by Cultural Night

Student Union
The Handique Girls College Students Union is the general body of the students of the College. Its membership is compulsory for every student admitted into the College. The office bearers of the Union are elected annually through direct ballot.
The Students' Union organizes various activities mainly Games and Sports, Debate, Cultural items and Social Service among the students. It also brings out a magazine annually as a medium for developing the potentialities of students.

See also
Shakuntala Choudhary

References

Women's universities and colleges in Assam
Universities and colleges in Guwahati
Colleges affiliated to Gauhati University
Educational institutions established in 1939
1939 establishments in India